This is a list of people who have appeared on the cover of i-D magazine from 1980 to the present:

1980s

1990s

2000s

2010s

2020s

External links 

 i-D cover archive: 1980 to 2016

Lists of people by magazine appearance
Lists of models